Кhatusha is a rural locality in Naumovsky Selsoviet Rural Settlement, Konyshyovsky District, Kursk Oblast, Russia. Population:

Geography 
The village is located on the Chmacha River (a left tributary of the Svapa River), 48 km from the Russia–Ukraine border, 79 km north-west of Kursk, 17.5 km north-west of the district center – the urban-type settlement Konyshyovka, 5 km from the selsoviet center – Naumovka.

 Climate
Кhatusha has a warm-summer humid continental climate (Dfb in the Köppen climate classification).

Transport 
Кhatusha is located 41 km from the federal route  Ukraine Highway, 52.5 km from the route  Crimea Highway, 23 km from the route  (Trosna – M3 highway), 8 km from the road of regional importance  (Dmitriyev – Beryoza – Menshikovo – Khomutovka), on the road of intermunicipal significance  (Konyshyovka – Makaro-Petrovskoye, with the access road to the villages of Belyayevo and Chernicheno), 7 km from the nearest railway halt 536 km (railway line Navlya – Lgov-Kiyevsky).

The rural locality is situated 85 km from Kursk Vostochny Airport, 176 km from Belgorod International Airport and 285 km from Voronezh Peter the Great Airport.

References

Notes

Sources

Rural localities in Konyshyovsky District